This is a list of schools in Slough in the English county of Berkshire.

State-funded schools

Primary schools

Castleview Primary School
The Cippenham School
Claycots School
Colnbrook CE Primary School
Foxborough Primary School
The Godolphin Junior Academy
Grove Academy
Holy Family RC Primary School
Iqra Slough Islamic Primary School
James Elliman Academy
Khalsa Primary School
The Langley Academy Primary
Langley Hall Primary Academy
The Langley Heritage Primary
Lynch Hill School Primary Academy
Marish Primary School
Montem Academy
Our Lady of Peace RC Primary School
Penn Wood Primary School
Phoenix Infant Academy
Pippins School
Priory School
Ryvers School
St Anthony's RC Primary School
St Ethelbert's RC Primary School
St Mary's CE Primary School
Western House Academy
Wexham Court Primary School
Willow Primary School

Non-selective secondary schools

Baylis Court School
Beechwood School
Ditton Park Academy
Eden Girls' School
Grove Academy
Langley Academy
Lynch Hill Enterprise Academy
St Joseph's Catholic High School
Slough and Eton Church of England Business and Enterprise College 
The Westgate School
Wexham School

Grammar schools
Herschel Grammar School
Langley Grammar School
St Bernard's Catholic Grammar School
Upton Court Grammar School

Special and alternative schools
Arbour Vale School 
Haybrook College
Littledown School

Further education
East Berkshire College

Independent schools

Primary and preparatory schools
Islamic Shakhsiyah Foundation
St Bernard's Preparatory School

Senior and all-through schools
Al-Madani Girls School
Al-Madani Independent Grammar School
Langley Hall Arts Academy
Long Close School

Special and alternative schools
Darul Madinah

Slough
Schools in Slough
School